A tulou, or "earthen building", is a traditional communal Hakka people residence found in Fujian, in South China, usually of a circular configuration surrounding a central shrine, and part of Hakka architecture.  These vernacular structures were occupied by clan groups.

Although most tulou were of earthen construction, the definition "tulou" is a broadly descriptive label for a building type and does not indicate construction type.  Some were constructed out of cut granite or had substantial walls of fired brick.  Most large-scale tulou seen today were built of a composite of earth, sand, and lime known as sanhetu rather than just earth. The tulou is often three to four stories high. Often they would store food on the higher floors.

Due to their unorthodox and strange appearance from the outside they were once mistaken for missile silos by American analysts during the Cold War. Others even compare it to ancient 'spaceships'.

The noted Fujian Tulou, designated as UNESCO World Heritage site in 2008, is a small and specialized subgroup of tulou, known for their unique shape, large scale, and ingenious structure.  There are more than 20,000 tulou in southern Fujian.  Approximately 3,000 of them are Fujian Tulou, that is 15% of tulou belong to the Fujian Tulou category.

Contemporary references

Film 
 In Secrets of the Furious Five, the Bao Gu Orphanage is a tulou.
 Portions of Stephen Chow's "Kung Fu Hustle" take place at a tulou.
 In the 2020 Mulan film, Mulan and her family live in a tulou. This has raised controversies as the first tulou was not built when the actual poem was written.
 In Big Fish and Begonia, most of the events take place in or near a tulou in the spirit realm.

Video games 

 In Front Mission 3 the main cast briefly goes to Yongding, where tulous can be seen in the background. The NPCs at the Yongding bar talk about tulous when you speak to them.

See also
 Earth structure
 Fujian Tulou
 Hakka walled village
 Siheyuan
 Hutong

References

External links

 National Geographic China's Remote Fortresses Lose Residents, Gain Tourists
 http://www.chinadwelling.dk/images/htm/13_01.htm
 http://www.chinadwelling.dk/hovedsider/construction-tekst.htm
 UNESCO World Heritage Site 1113: Fujian Tulou
 From the Earth Article about the Tulou earth villages of the Fujian Hakka

Buildings and structures in Fujian
Architecture in China
Castles by type
Hakka architecture